Legend is a 1984 soundtrack album for the ITV television series Robin of Sherwood, by the Irish folk group Clannad. It is their eighth album. In 1985, this album won the BAFTA award for Best Original Television Music, making Clannad the first Irish band to win the award.

Singles released 

"Robin (The Hooded Man)", the title theme from the series, was released on a 7-inch single in 1984, featuring actor Michael Praed as Robin of Sherwood on the sleeve.

In addition, "Now Is Here" and "Scarlet Inside" were released as singles in their own right.

"Robin (The Hooded Man)" was re-released in 1986 as an "Extended Play Single" with a newly recorded version of the title theme and featuring actor Jason Connery on the sleeve. For this re-release, the B-sides include "Now Is Here", "Herne" and "Caisleán Óir" (as it appears on the album Macalla).

Alternate versions of songs 
In addition to the tracks on Legend, which were used extensively in the series, music composed for the show was occasionally released elsewhere in different versions.

The introduction track to Clannad's Macalla album "Caislean Oir" appeared in an alternate version as incidental music in the series.

In 2003, Clannad albums from the Sony/BMG label were remastered and released with new cover art, and remixes as bonus tracks. For the 2003 Deluxe Edition of Legend, the bonus track was "Together We – Cantoma Mix".

On the 2005 release Clannad: Live in Concert, there were live performances of unreleased music including "Dance & Teidhir Abhaile Riu" from Series 1 and "Action" and "Royal" from Series 3 as part of a "Robin of Sherwood Medley".

Another theme from the series was reworked as the song "Almost Seems (Too Late to Turn)".

Unreleased music 

In a statement posted in November 2003 on their official web site, Clannad revealed that,
"there were several other pieces of music recorded for the 3rd series of Robin of Sherwood that were not included on the Legend album. Unfortunately no-one has been able to locate the master tapes of this music. The search is continuing and hopefully one day these recordings will be able to be released."

Both sets 1 and 2 of the European and North American Blu-ray releases of Robin of Sherwood have a "music only" track for many of the episodes. This allows listeners to hear music from all 3 series, including music that was not included on "Legend" and music recorded after the release of Legend, to be heard on their own.

Music performed live 

During the 1984 tour, the setlist included full live versions of "Lady Marian", "Now Is Here", "Robin (The Hooded Man)", "Scarlet Inside", "Herne", "Ancient Forest" and "Battles".

Since then, Clannad regularly includes a "Robin Of Sherwood Medley" in their setlist that typically includes the title song, and segments of "Lady Marian", "Herne" and "Ancient Forest", as well as the unreleased "Dance" from Series 1 and two songs from Series 3 entitled "Action" and "Royal" that have only been released on live albums including Clannad: Live in Concert (released 2005).

Charts

Weekly charts

Year-end charts

Track listing
 "Robin (The Hooded Man)" (Ciarán Brennan) – 2:48
 "Now Is Here" (Pól Brennan) – 3:32
 "Herne" (P. Brennan) – 5:08
 "Together We" (P. Brennan) – 3:28
 "Darkmere" (C. Brennan) – 1:59
 "Strange Land" (P. Brennan) – 3:10
 "Scarlet Inside" (P. Brennan) – 5:08
 "Lady Marian" (C. Brennan) – 3:20
 "Battles" (C. Brennan) – 1:01
 "Ancient Forest" (P. Brennan, C. Brennan, Máire Brennan) – 2:59
 "Together We – Cantoma Mix" (bonus track available only on 2003 Deluxe Edition) - 2:05

Singles
 "Robin (The Hooded Man)"
 "Now Is Here"
 "Scarlet Inside"
 "Robin (The Hooded Man)" EP (series three remix of theme tune)

Personnel

Band
 Máire Brennan – lead vocal, harp
 Pól Brennan – guitar, flute, tin whistle, keyboards, vocals
 Ciarán Brennan – double bass, synthesisers, guitar, vocals
 Pádraig Duggan – mandola, guitar, vocals
 Noel Duggan – guitar, vocals

Additional musicians
 James Delaney – keyboards
 Paul Moran – drums
 Pat Farrell – electric guitar
 Frank Ricotti – percussion

References

External links
 Legend on Clannad's official web site

Clannad albums
Depictions of Robin Hood in music
Television soundtracks
1984 soundtrack albums
RCA Records soundtracks
Albums produced by Tony Clarke (producer)